Special Field Orders No. 120 (series 1864) were military orders issued during the American Civil War, on November 9, 1864, by Major General William Tecumseh Sherman of the Union Army. He issued these orders in preparation for his famous March to the Sea, also known as the Savannah Campaign.

Orders

Publication in the Official Record
This order is part of the Official Records of the American Civil War. It can be found in Series I — Military Operations, Volume XXXIX, Part III, Pages 713–714. The volume was published in 1892.

See also
 Sherman's Special Field Orders, No. 15
 Sherman's Special Field Orders, No. 119
 "Sherman's March to the Sea" in the New Georgia Encyclopedia
 Caudill, Edward, and Paul Ashdown. Sherman’s March in Myth and Memory. New York: Rowman & Littlefield Publishers, 2008.
 Frank, Lisa Tendrich. The Civilian War: Confederate Women and Union Soldiers during Sherman’s March. Baton Rouge: Louisiana State University Press, 2015.
 Huff, Lawrence. “‘A Bitter Draught We Have Had to Quaff’: Sherman’s March Through the Eyes of Joseph Addison Turner.” The Georgia Historical Quarterly 72, no. 2 (1988): 306–26.
 Marszalek, John F. Sherman’s March to the Sea. 1st ed. Abilene, TX: McWhiney Foundation Press, 2005.
 Rubin, Anne Sarah. Through the Heart of Dixie: Sherman’s March and American Memory. 1st ed. Chapel Hill: The University of North Carolina Press, 2014.
 Wills, Charles Wright, and Mary E. Kellogg. Army Life of an Illinois Soldier Including a Day-by-Day Record of Sherman’s March to the Sea : Letters and Diary of Charles W. Wills. Carbondale: Southern Illinois University Press, 1996.

References

American Civil War documents
General orders
Collective punishment
Georgia (U.S. state) in the American Civil War
1864 documents